The 1940 Campeonato Nacional de Fútbol Profesional was Chilean first tier’s 8th season. Universidad de Chile was the tournament’s champion, being this title its first ever professional honor.

Scores

Schedule

Topscorers

References

External links
ANFP 
RSSSF Chile 1940

Primera División de Chile seasons
Primera
Chile